Christian Kouan Oulaï (born 1 January 1999), known as Christian Kouan,  is an Ivorian professional footballer who plays as a midfielder for Perugia.

Club career
He made his Serie B debut for Perugia on 20 January 2018, in a game against Virtus Entella. He also scored on his debut.

International career 
On 24 August 2020, he received his first call-up by the Ivory Coast senior national team.

References

External links
 

1999 births
Living people
Ivorian footballers
A.C. Perugia Calcio players
Serie B players
Ivorian expatriate footballers
Expatriate footballers in Italy
Ivorian expatriate sportspeople in Italy
Association football midfielders